Kubin is a village in Azerbaijan.

Kubin may also refer to:

Places 
 Dolný Kubín, a town in Slovakia
 Kovin (German: Kubin), a town in Serbia
 Kubin, a town on Moa Island in Australia
 Vyšný Kubín, a village in Slovakia

People 
Kubín a surname of Czech origin. The word is derived from the given name Kuba, a diminutive of Jakub.
 Alfred Kubin (1877–1959), Austrian painter and printmaker
 Felix Kubin (born 1969), German musician
 Kip Kubin (born 1965), American film director
 Larry Kubin (born 1959), American football player
 Otakar Kubín (1883–1969), Czech painter and sculptor
 Wolfgang Kubin (born 1945), German poet and translator